King Yi of Yan (died 321 BC), ancestral name Jī (姬), clan name Yān (燕), personal name unknown, was the first king of the state of Yan in Warring States period of Chinese history. He ruled the state between 331 BC until his death in 321 BC.

He was the son of Duke Wen of Yan. He came to the throne after his father's death, in the same year, Yan was attacked by Qi and lost ten cities. He sent Su Qin to Qi and successfully persuaded King Xuan of Qi to return these cities.

In 323 BC, He promoted himself the king. However, during the last three years of his reign, the court was controlled by the powerful chancellor Su Qin. King Yi died in 321 BC, succeeded by his son Kuai.

References

Monarchs of Yan (state)
321 BC deaths
Chinese kings
Yan (state)
Zhou dynasty nobility
Year of birth unknown
4th-century BC Chinese monarchs